The 2019 Thailand Champions Cup was the 3rd Thailand Champions Cup, an annual football match contested by the winners of the previous season's Thai League 1 and Thai FA Cup competitions. It was sponsored by Government Savings Bank (Omsin Bank), and known as the Omsin Thailand Champions Cup for sponsorship purposes. The match was played at Royal Thai Army Stadium, Bangkok and contested by 2018 Thai League 1 champions Buriram United, and Chiangrai United as the champions of the 2018 Thai FA Cup.

Qualified teams

Match

Details

Assistant referees:
 Phattharaphong Kitsathit
 Aphichit Nophuan
Fourth official:
 Sivakorn Pu-udom

Winner

See also
 2019 Thai League 1
 2019 Thai League 2
 2019 Thai League 3
 2019 Thai League 4
 2019 Thai FA Cup
 2019 Thai League Cup

References

2019 in Thai football cups
Thailand Champions Cup
2019